Mantronix were an influential 1980s hip hop and electro funk music group from New York City. The band was formed by DJ Kurtis Mantronik (Kurtis el Khaleel) and rapper MC Tee (Touré Embden). The group is primarily remembered for its pioneering blend of old school hip hop, electronic, and club music. They underwent several genre and line-up changes during its seven-year existence between 1984 and 1991, and released five albums beginning with their 1985 debut Mantronix: The Album.

History

Early years: 1984–1988 
Kurtis Mantronik (Kurtis el Khaleel), a Jamaican-American  émigré, began experimenting with electro music in the early 1980s, inspired by early electro tracks like "Riot in Lagos" (1980) by Yellow Magic Orchestra's Ryuichi Sakamoto. In 1984, while working as the in-store DJ for Downtown Records in Manhattan, Kurtis Mantronik met MC Tee, a Haitian-born, Flatbush, Brooklyn-based rapper (and regular record store customer). The duo soon made a demo, "Fresh Is The Word," and eventually signed with William Socolov's Sleeping Bag Records.

Mantronix: the Album 
Mantronix's debut single, "Fresh Is the Word," was a club hit in 1985, reaching No. 16 on Billboard Magazine's Hot Dance Singles Sales chart, and was featured on Mantronix: The Album which was released the same year.

Mantronix's efforts on Mantronix: the Album and its effect on early hip hop and electronic music is perhaps best summed up by music critic Omar Willey's observation in 2000:

The influence of Mantronix: The Album is seen among other artists through the sampling of "Needle to the Groove" by Beck in the single "Where It's At" from the 1996 album, Odelay ("we've got two turntables and a microphone..."), as well as, "Fresh Is The Word" by the Beastie Boys in the single "Jimmy James" from the 1992 album, Check Your Head ("for all the Blacks, Puerto Ricans, and the White people too...") The Beastie Boys later sampled "Bassline" for the song "3 the Hard Way" on their 2004 album To the 5 Boroughs.

Music Madness 
Mantronix's second album, Music Madness, was released in 1986.  While MC Tee's rhyming style on the album continued in the traditional b-boy fashion of the times, Mantronik's club-oriented production and mixing in Music Madness tended to attract more electronic dance music and electro funk aficionados than hardcore hip-hop fans. During this period, while Mantronix was signed to Sleeping Bag Records, Mantronik was employed by the label in their A&R Department, while also producing other artists and groups, including Just-Ice, T La Rock, Nocera, and Joyce Sims.

In Full Effect 

Mantronix signed with Capitol Records in 1987, in what was one of the first 7-figure deals for a hip-hop group, and released In Full Effect in 1988, which, according to the liner notes, was the first album to be mastered from DAT instead of reel-to-reel tape. The album continued in and expanded on the hip-hop/electro funk/dance music vein of its predecessor, eventually reaching No. 18 on the Top R&B/Hip-Hop Albums chart, Mantronix's highest showing for an album. In Full Effect marked the last Mantronix album with rapper MC Tee, who left the group to enlist in the United States Air Force.

Mantronix's 1988 track "King of the Beats" was one of the first songs to sample the Amen break. "King of the Beats" itself became one of the most sampled songs in music history, having been sampled more than 200 times, rivaling that of "Amen, Brother" itself.

Later era: 1989–1991

This Should Move Ya 
Following the departure of MC Tee, rapper Bryce "Luvah" Wilson and Mantronik's cousin, D.J. D., joined the group. Mantronik met Wilson, a fellow Sleeping Bag Records label mate, while doing production work for Wilson's aborted solo project.

The album spawned two top-10 hits on the British singles chart, "Got to Have Your Love" at No. 4, and "Take Your Time (featuring vocalist Wondress)" at No. 10. In the United States, the album reached No. 61 on the Top R&B/Hip-Hop Albums chart.

In a 1991 interview, Kurtis Mantronik commented on the commercial success of "Got to Have Your Love":

The Incredible Sound Machine 
Mantronix's final release, with vocalist Jade Trini replacing D.J. D, was The Incredible Sound Machine in 1991. Grammy-nominated neo soul singer/songwriter Angie Stone co-wrote seven of the eleven tracks that appeared on The Incredible Sound Machine.  The Incredible Sound Machine, which tended to favor R&B, new jack swing, and dance music over hip hop, was considered both a critical and commercial disappointment.

Shortly after a European tour and promotion related to the release of The Incredible Sound Machine, the group disbanded, and Mantronik left the music industry altogether for seven years.

Kurtis Mantronik resurfaced in Europe in the late 1990s, producing house- and techno-music artists, and remains active in pop-oriented electronic music.

Discography

Albums

Compilation albums

Singles

References

Further reading

External links 
Mantronix at soulmovement.nl
[ AllMusic.com Biography – Mantronix]
Discogs Profile – Mantronix
Angie Stone 2016 Interview at Soulinterviews.com

1984 establishments in New York City
1991 disestablishments in New York (state)
Electronic music groups from New York (state)
American hip hop groups
Electronic music duos
Musical groups established in 1984
Musical groups disestablished in 1991
Musicians from New York City
American electro musicians
Capitol Records artists
Sleeping Bag Records artists
Virgin Records artists